Belençay is a village in the Şirvan District of Siirt Province in Turkey. The village had a population of 82 in 2021.

The hamlets of Darıcık and İncecik are attached to Belençay.

References 

Kurdish settlements in Siirt Province
Villages in Şirvan District